The 2021 Indy Lights season was the 35th season of the Indy Lights open wheel motor racing series and the 19th sanctioned by IndyCar, acting as the primary support series for the IndyCar Series. After going into a hiatus in 2020 because of the COVID-19 pandemic, the season started on April 17 at Barber Motorsports Park and was held over 20 races spanning ten meetings.

Series news 
On October 7, 2020, Indy Lights announced a series of changes for the 2021 season. The champion's scholarship increased to $1,250,000. The top-three finishers in the championship each earned an IndyCar Series test and all cars were now equipped with a titanium halo to increase driver safety.

Team and driver chart 
The following drivers and teams competed in the series.

1Juncos Racing were rebranded as Juncos Hollinger Racing in August 2021

Schedule 
The provisional 2021 race calendar was announced on October 21, 2020, with the final round to be announced at a later date. This last round was later confirmed to be at Barber Motorsports park, after the IndyCar series moved its season opener there. The calendar was the first since 2002 to not feature the Freedom 100 at Indianapolis Motor Speedway. The Toronto round originally scheduled was replaced by a standalone second weekend at Mid-Ohio in October.

Race results

Championship standings

Drivers' Championship

Scoring system

 The driver who qualified on pole was awarded one additional point.
 An additional point was awarded to the driver who led the most laps in a race.

Teams' championship 

 Scoring system

 Single car teams received 3 bonus points as an equivalency to multi-car teams
 Only the best two results counted for teams fielding more than two entries

Notes

See also 
 2021 IndyCar Series
 2021 Indy Pro 2000 Championship
 2021 U.S. F2000 National Championship

References

External links 

 

Indy Lights
Indy Lights seasons
Indy Lights